Pogonocherus anatolicus is a species of beetle in the family Cerambycidae. It was described by Daniel in 1898. It is known from Syria, Cyprus, and Turkey.

References

Pogonocherini
Beetles described in 1898